Welshpool railway station on the Cambrian Line in Powys, mid-Wales, serves the town of Welshpool.

History

Built by the Oswestry & Newtown Railway, the original station opened on 14 August 1860. The line was initially operated by the London & North Western Railway before being absorbed by the Cambrian Railways, which became part of the Great Western Railway at the grouping which came into effect on 1 January 1923.

Midland Counties Dairy bought and operated the creamery at Cilcewydd. A siding from the station gave access for milk trains to the creamery.

About 100 metres north of the station were exchange sidings with the narrow gauge Welshpool & Llanfair Light Railway which opened for freight traffic in 1903 and closed in 1956 with a separate station serving passenger traffic until 1931. By 2017 the only remains are part of the cattle dock which has mixed gauge track embedded into concrete track bed. All other remains of this station and the site of the railway were obliterated by the construction of the new A483 road.

Present

There was some severe rationalisation of services under the Beeching cuts in the 1960s, with the old Cambrian main line to Whitchurch via  closed to passengers in January 1965 and most local stations towards Aberystwyth following suit later that year. Two of the four platforms at the old station were later taken out of use. Subsequent development of the A483 road Welshpool bypass (opened in July 1993) required the railway line to be shifted to the south. To enable this the original station was closed, and a new single island platform constructed by British Rail south of it, to allow realignment in May 1992.

The replacement station platform is reached by a pedestrian bridge crossing both the railway and the A483, with long uncovered inclines to the north and stepped access from the south. There are no facilities beyond a ticket vending machine, small shelter, bench seating, passenger information displays and a customer help point (though the National Rail Enquiries station page does have directions to a local travel agent with National Rail ticketing facilities). The original station building can still be seen across the road, and has been converted into a shop and café.

Services
There is a basic two-hourly service each way - on weekdays & Saturdays with additional hourly Shrewsbury to Aberystwyth services until mid morning & again during late afternoon and early evenings. On Sundays there is a two-hourly service on the Shrewsbury - Aberystwyth axis, but only a limited service along the coast to/from Pwllheli (three in summer and one in winter).

References

Further reading

External links

Railway stations in Powys
DfT Category F1 stations
Former Cambrian Railway stations
Railway stations in Great Britain opened in 1860
Railway stations in Great Britain closed in 1992
Railway stations opened by British Rail
Railway stations in Great Britain opened in 1992
Railway stations served by Transport for Wales Rail
Welshpool
1862 establishments in Wales